Nika Dam  is a gravity dam located in Hiroshima Prefecture in Japan. The dam is used for flood control. The catchment area of the dam is 10.5 km2. The dam impounds about 21  ha of land when full and can store 2710 thousand cubic meters of water. The construction of the dam was started on 1970 and completed in 2011.

References

Dams in Hiroshima Prefecture